Bulbophyllum sect. Bulbophyllaria is a section of the genus Bulbophyllum. It is one of six Bulbophyllum sections found in the Americas.

Description
Species in this section have bifoliate pseudobulbs, inflorescence with fleshy a rachis holding flowers that are spirally arranged. Lateral sepals totally free, petals erect. Column foot with entire apex and shorter than the length of the column.

Distribution
Plants from this section are found in Central America through Venezuela, Bolivia and Brazil.

Species
Bulbophyllum section Bulbophyllaria comprises the following species:

References

Orchid subgenera